The women's synchronised 10 metre platform diving competition at the 2012 Olympic Games in London took place on 31 July at the Aquatics Centre within the Olympic Park.

The Chinese team of Chen Ruolin and Wang Hao won the gold medal.

Format

A single round was held, with each team making five dives.  Eleven judges scored each dive:  three for each diver, and five for synchronisation.  Only the middle score counted for each diver, with the middle three counting for synchronisation.  These five scores were averaged, multiplied by 3, and multiplied by the dive's degree of difficulty to give a total dive score.  The scores for each of the five dives were summed to give a final score.

Schedule 
Times are British Summer Time (UTC+1)

Results

References

Diving at the 2012 Summer Olympics
2012
2012 in women's diving
Women's events at the 2012 Summer Olympics